Mercury project may refer to:

 Project Mercury, the first human spaceflight program of the U.S., 1958–1963
 Project Mercury (album), by Rosetta and Balboa, 2007
 Mercury (satellite), a series of three U.S. spy satellites launched in the 1990s
 Game Gear console, developed as Project Mercury
 Rocket's Red Glare, a 2000 TV movie originally titled Mercury Project
 Project Mercury, a prototype of Linksys iPhone

See also
 Mercury program (disambiguation)
 Mercury (disambiguation)